Fivemiletown United Football Club is an intermediate-level football club who play in the Intermediate A division of the Mid-Ulster Football League in Northern Ireland. The club is based in Fivemiletown, County Tyrone. Their home ground has been the Valley Stadium on the Cooneen Road in the Town since 1993. The club was formed in 1888 giving Fivemiletown United the illustrious honour of being the oldest club in Northern Ireland not playing at Senior Level in the country.

Fivemiletown United's most famous moment came in December 2016 when they defeated Premier Intermediate League side Dundela F.C. in the 4th Round of the Irish Cup 4–3. The first time the club had ever progressed past the Third Round. However the club's most successful period came under stalwart Davy McQuigg as underdogs in the Intermediate B division; they defeated Intermediate A Champions Annagh United in the Premier Cup Final. Annagh went on to play in the Senior Divisions after this season and have not returned to Intermediate football since. In 2005 McQuigg's side beat a future Premiership club Warrenpoint Town in the same final. His side won the Intermediate B at the first attempt in 2002/03. Andy Parkinson is the only manager Since to win a trophy at Intermediate Level winning the Marshall Cup in 2010/11. Leaving McQuigg & Parkinson as the club's most successful managers. The club reached the Premier Cup Final in 2009, 2011 and 2014, losing the former matches against Dollingstown and the latter against Newry City AFC. Scott Robinson brought short-term success during his tenure as manager in 2016/17 leading the club to Irish Cup Fifth Round. However, at the end of the season after a disappointing league campaign several players left for pastures new and Robinson followed, leaving the Town to rebuild again.
Town then appointed former manager Raymond Clarke to the job with former goalkeeper David Ballantine joining as First Team Coach. After three years where Clarke overseen the club stabilise their position in the MUFL Intermediate A. At the end of the 2020/21 season. Clarke was replaced Chris McDowell & Barry Anderson in a joint managerial partnership. McDowell who was a firm fan favourite holding the illustrious honour of having made the All Time Most Appearances for the club. Anderson had previously featured also as a player and most notably as a youth coach guiding the U19s to successive cup final wins in 2018 and again in 2019. On 24 June 2022 Fivemiletown ended an eleven-year wait for a trophy when they defeated Oxford Sunnyside 2–0 in the Marshall Cup final in Armagh. The trophy they had won eleven years earlier against Hill Street another Lurgan based side.

Current squad

Famous Players & Honours

Famous Players

Roy Carroll –  Roy Carroll started his career with Fivemiletown United. The ex Manchester United keeper is undoubtedly the towns most famous ex player, having won the FA Cup and Premier League with the Red Devils. Roy's brother Ricki is a striker in the club's firsts team. Caroll is now the goalkeeping coach for the Northern Ireland National Team.

Dermott McCaffery-
The ex Hibernian and Falkirk Defender began his career with Fivemiletown United before moving on to Dunbreen Rovers. He is the currently overseeing youth operations at Armagh City.

Alvin Rouse The town announced the signing of The former Macclesfield Town Goalkeeper and current Barbados national team keeper on 14 June 2019 before retiring in May 2021.

Lee Bradbury the former Manchester City and Portsmouth striker played briefly for Fivemiletown during the 1990s when stationed in Northern Ireland with the British Army

Simon Yeo the former Lincoln City striker played briefly for Fivemiletown during the 1990s when stationed in Northern Ireland with the British Army. Appearing in the 1995 Mulhern Cup Final which they lost to Enniskillen Rangers.

Intermediate Honours

Mid Ulster Intermediate B Division Champions: 2002–03

Premier Cup: 2001–02, 2005–06

Marshall Cup: 2010–11 & 2021–22

Junior Honours

Division 1 Mercer League Champions: 1950–51, 1951–52

Mulhern Cup: 1933, 1941 (both as Fivemiletown), 1951, 1952, 1953

Coffey Cup: 1939 (as Fivemiletown Blues), 1948, 1973, 1974, 1977 (as Valley United) 1993, 2005 (as Valley All Stars), 2016

McCabe Cup: 1949

Erskine Cup: 1951

Killyman and District League: 1951

McCammon Cup: 1962, 1973

Greystone League: 1960, 1961, 1962, 1963 (all as Fivemiletown), 1972, 1974, 1980

Fivemiletown Knockout Cup: 1973, 1974, 1975, 1976

Armstrong Cup: 2014, 2018

Youth Honours

Fermanagh & Western Youth League (1) – 2016/17

Lowry Cowry Cup (2) – 2005 & 2008

Mid Ulster Juvenile League Gilkinson Cup (1) – 2017/18

Mid Ulster Juvenile League Decor Cup (1) – 2018/19

References

Association football clubs in County Tyrone
 
Association football clubs in Northern Ireland